Església de Sant Cristòfol d'Anyós  is a church located in Anyós, La Massana Parish, Andorra. It is a heritage property registered in the Cultural Heritage of Andorra. It was built in the 12th century.

References

La Massana
Roman Catholic churches in Andorra
Cultural Heritage of Andorra